John T. Roberts MM was a Scottish amateur footballer who played as a centre half in the Scottish League for Queen's Park.

Personal life 
Prior to the First World War, Roberts worked as a drapery warehouseman. After Britain's entry into the war in August 1914, Roberts enlisted in the Highland Light Infantry and was serving as a sergeant when he won the Military Medal for "gallant conduct" on the first day on the Somme in July 1916. During the course of the action he was shot in the shoulder and recovered back in Britain.

References

1891 births
Scottish footballers
Scottish Football League players
British Army personnel of World War I
Highland Light Infantry soldiers
People from Anderston
Association football wing halves
Queen's Park F.C. players
Recipients of the Military Medal
Date of death missing
Footballers from Glasgow